Mycocitrus is a genus of fungi in the family Bionectriaceae.

References

Sordariomycetes genera
Bionectriaceae